This is a list of Tamil Muslims  worldwide.

Economy

 Mecca Rafeeque Ahmed - entrepreneur, recipient of 2011 Padma Shri Award
 B. S. Abdur Rahman - (1927 – 2015) entrepreneur, philanthropist and educationist.

Politics and law

Politicians

 K. A. M. Muhammed Abubacker (born 1971) - Legislative Party Leader of the Indian Union Muslim League from 2016 to 2021.
 A. Aslam Basha (1968 -2020) - member of the 14th Tamil Nadu Legislative Assembly
 M. Muhammad Ismail (1896—1972) - first president of the Indian Union Muslim League
 M. H. Jawahirullah - (born 1959) - member of Tamil Nadu Legislative Assembly 2021 and founding member/leader of the Manithaneya Makkal Katchi party
 T. P. M. Mohideen Khan (born 1947) - former minister for environment in the Tamil Nadu Legislative Assembly
 S. M. Abdul Majid -  minister for local administration in Kamaraj cabinet between 1962 and 1963
 K. S. Masthan (born 1955) - MLA from 2016 and Minister from 2021
 K. M. Kader Mohideen (born 1940) - current National President, Indian Union Muslim League, former Lok Sabha member 2004-2009
 Kani K. Navas (born 1979) - Lok Sabha member for the Indian Union Muslim League 2019-to date
 S. J. Sadiq Pasha - former Member of the Legislative Assembly of Tamil Nadu
 M. Mariam Pichai (died 2011) - appointed as minister in the 2011 Legislative Assembly election, but died on his way to the oath-swearing ceremony
 Abdul Azeez Abdul Rahim, (born 1966) - a Malaysian politician, MP since May 2013 and chairman of the Tabung Haji from 2013 to 2018.
 Abdul Rahman (born 1959) - Lok Sabha member for the Indian Union Muslim League 2009-2014
 J. M. Aaroon Rashid (born 1950) - former member of the Parliament of India, representing the Theni Lok Sabha constituency. 
 A. Anwar Rhazza - former Member of the Legislative Assembly of Tamil Nadu
 Yakub Hasan Sait (1875–1940) - served as the Minister for Public Works in the Madras presidency for the Indian Union Muslim League
 A. K. A. Abdul Samad {{1926-1999) - state President of the Indian Union Muslim League
 Aloor Shanavas (born 1982) - politician, writer and social worker from Tamil Nadu. currently a Member of Tamil Nadu Legislative Assembly 
 S. M. Muhammed Sheriff - elected to Lok Sabha from Periyakulam constituency as an Indian Union Muslim League candidate in 1971
 S. N. M. Ubayadullah (born 1941) - former minister for Commercial Taxes in Tamil Nadu
 Sir Mohammad Usman (1884–1960) - served as the Minister of Home for the Madras Presidency and the first Indian acting Governor of Madras
 Y. S. M. Yusuf - former MLA and former Minister of Public Work Department, Irrigation department of Tamil Nadu

Justices

 M. M. Ismail {1921-2005) - former State Governor and Chief Justice

Science
 A. P. J. Abdul Kalam (1931 - 2015) - aerospace scientist and statesman who was the 11th President of India from 2002 to 2007
 Masha Nazeem (born 1993) - inventor

Literature

 Makkal Paavalar Inqulab
 Manushyaputhiran
 Thoppil Mohamed Meeran
 Mu. Metha
 Umaru Pulavar
 S. Abdul Rahman
 Rajathi Salma
 P. Dawood Shah
 Ka. Mu. Sheriff

Sport
 Nasser Hussain OBE, the captain of the England cricket team during 1999-2003
 Syed Sabir Pasha Football

Art

Cinema

 I. Ahmed
 Ameer (director)
 Aziz Ansari
 Arav
 Irfan
 Mansoor Ali Khan
 Monica
 Nassar
 Rajkiran
 Ibrahim Rowther
 Shaam
 Halitha Shameem

Musicians

 Ghibran
 Shahul Hameed
 Nagore E. M. Hanifa
 Mu. Metha
 A. R. Rahman
 A. R. Reihana
 Shabir

References

Lists of Indian people by community
 List